Saidabad (also Romanized as Sa‘īdābād) is a village in Chaldoran-e Jonubi Rural District, in the Central District of Chaldoran County, West Azerbaijan Province, Iran. At the 2006 census, its population was 58, in 8 families.

References 

Populated places in Chaldoran County